Poder Paralelo is a Brazilian telenovela produced by Rede Record that premiered on April 14, 2009 and ended on March 10, 2010. Written by Lauro César Muniz and directed by Ignácio Coqueiro, it will portray a corruption scheme involving an Italian-Brazilian family. Prior to Record's official announcement, the media was referring to the telenovela by its working title Vendetta.  It ran for one season.

Plot
The telenovela focuses on Tony Castellamare, a Brazilian citizen of Italian origin living in Palermo. He maintains the image of a merchant exporter, but is actually the leader of the Sicilian drug mafia. After an attack aimed at him kills his wife Marina and their twin daughters, Tony returns to São Paulo seeking revenge, at the same time he is investigated by the uncorruptible federal police officer Teolônio "Téo" Meira.

Inspiration
Poder Paralelo is based on Honra ou Vendetta, the only novel by sports journalist and cuisine author Sílvio Lancelotti, originally published in 2001. The plot, however, had to be readapted, since the book contained only five major female characters.

According to Muniz, Téo is based on the federal police officer Protógenes Queiroz, responsible for the investigation and arrest of banker Daniel Dantas, accused of money laundering and convicted for attempting to bribe a federal police officer.

Editing controversy
The head of Rede Record vetoed Muniz from writing scenes featuring thighs, breasts, buttocks and coarse language. This caused a controversy in Brazil, as well as accusations of hypocrisy from the head of the network, once violent scenes, featuring as even as torture, remained untouched.

Main cast
Gabriel Braga Nunes - Tony Castellamare
Tuca Andrada - Telônio "Téo" Meira
Paloma Duarte - Fernanda Lira
Marcelo Serrado - Bruno Vilar
Petrônio Gontijo - Rudi Castellamare
Miriam Freeland - Lígia Brandini
Adriana Garambone - Maura Vilar 
Gracindo Júnior - Don Caló Castellamare
Lu Grimaldi - Mamma Freda Castellamare
Karen Junqueira - Giana "Gigi" Castellamare
Paulo Gorgulho - José Santana
Maria Ribeiro - Marília
Cecil Thiré - Armando
Márcio Kieling - Alberto
Fernanda Nobre - Luísa
Guilherme Boury - Pedro
Patrícia França - Nina Santana
Bete Coelho - Vânia
André Bankoff - André Campos
Miguel Thiré - Douglas (Dog)
Luma Costa - Bebel
Castrinho - Leonel Pavão
Nicola Siri - Paulo Garzia
Antônio Abujamra - Marco Iago

Soundtrack 
Soundtrack is the song "Bellissimo Cosí" by Laura Pausini.

References

External links
Poder Paralelo official website
Poder Paralelo at Rede Record Press Room website

2009 telenovelas
2009 Brazilian television series debuts
2010 Brazilian television series endings
Brazilian telenovelas
RecordTV telenovelas
Television series about organized crime
Portuguese-language telenovelas
Works about organized crime in Brazil